The Metropolitan City of Bari is a metropolitan city in the Apulia region of Italy. Its capital is the city of Bari. It replaced the Province of Bari and includes the city of Bari and some forty other municipalities (comuni). It was first created by the reform of local authorities (Law 142/1990) and then established by the Law 56/2014. It has been operative since January 1, 2015.

The Metropolitan City of Bari is headed by the Metropolitan Mayor (Sindaco metropolitano) and by the Metropolitan Council (Consiglio metropolitano). Since 1 January 2015 Antonio Decaro, as mayor of the capital city, has been the first mayor of the Metropolitan City.

Geography
Overlooking the Adriatic Sea in south-eastern Italy, the Province of Bari is located in the central part of Apulia and is bordered on the west by the provinces of Matera and Potenza, to the north by the province of Barletta-Andria-Trani, and to the south by the provinces of Taranto and Brindisi. The province of Bari was formerly a part of the region of Terra di Bari, which once included the towns of Fasano and Cisternino, now in the province of Brindisi.

The area is dominated by the Murgia hills in the inner part, a karst plateau which is the home of the Alta Murgia National Park, one of the newest national parks in Italy, established in 2004. Only the Bari hinterland and the coastal strip are flat. The north of the province, with Bari, Altamura, Bitonto, Corato, Gravina in Puglia, and Molfetta, is heavily populated. The south, on the contrary, is characterized by the absence of these large centers; the only municipality to be around 50,000 inhabitants is Monopoli. In the southern part of the province, on the border with that of Taranto, is the Itria Valley, between the towns of Alberobello, Locorotondo, Cisternino and Martina Franca. The province is largely devoid of rivers and lakes, although underground rivers in the karst landscape has formed numerous caves, including those of Castellana and Putignano.

Cities and comunes 

With the establishment of the Province of Barletta-Andria-Trani in 2004, in addition to the provincial capitals, the province of Bari lost another 4 municipalities, i.e. Bisceglie, Canosa di Puglia, Minervino Murge and Spinazzola.
This left the remaining Province of Bari with 41 comuni and an adjusted population of 1,248,084 as of the 2005 census.

 Acquaviva delle Fonti
 Adelfia
 Alberobello
 Altamura
 Bari
 Binetto
 Bitetto
 Bitonto
 Bitritto
 Capurso
 Casamassima
 Castellana Grotte
 Cellamare
 Conversano
 Corato
 Gioia del Colle
 Giovinazzo
 Gravina in Puglia
 Grumo Appula
 Locorotondo
 Modugno
 Mola di Bari
 Molfetta
 Monopoli
 Noci
 Noicattaro
 Palo del Colle
 Poggiorsini
 Polignano a Mare
 Putignano
 Rutigliano
 Ruvo di Puglia
 Santeramo in Colle
 Sannicandro di Bari
 Terlizzi
 Toritto
 Triggiano
 Turi
 Valenzano

Government

List of Metropolitan Mayors of Bari

Economy
The arable land in the Province of Bari is exploited with the cultivation of olive and grapes but also cherries, peaches, and almonds. From that agricultural activity is derived olive oil, wine and table grapes. Bitonto is especially noted for its extra virgin olive oil, and Corato (with the Coratina olive variety) and Giovinazzo are along notable producing areas. The centers of wine production are mainly concentrated in Gravina and Ruvo di Puglia, in the north of Bari, and Adelfia, Noicattaro, Rutigliano and Locorotondo, in the south of Bari. Also important is the production of cherries; the Apulian red is especially prevalent in the countryside of Turi and Putignano.

References

External links

 Official website

 
Bari